These are the list of Industrial areas in Dubai.

See also

 List of communities in Dubai
 Developments in Dubai
 List of development projects in Dubai

References
Emiratesfreezone.com

Communities in Dubai
Dubai
Industrial areas